Colette Dalal Tchantcho is a Kuwaiti-Cameroonian actress and theatre maker. She is known for her roles in the Sky Atlantic series Domina (2021) and the Starz series Dangerous Liaisons (2022).

Early life
Tchantcho was born in Kuwait to a Cameroonian father from Bangangté and a Kuwaiti mother. Her maternal side is Sunni. She attended the British School in Kuwait (BSK). She graduated with a Bachelor of Arts in Acting from the Liverpool Institute for Performing Arts (LIPA) in 2011.

Career
Tchantcho made her television debut in 2018 with guest appearances in the BBC One medical soap opera Doctors and the BBC Four documentary series Arena. She also played Orsino in Twelfth Night at the Royal Lyceum Theatre in Edinburgh and the Bristol Old Vic and toured Scotland with Eddie and the Slumber Girls. The following year, she played Véa in an episode of the Netflix fantasy series The Witcher.

In 2021, Tchantcho began starring as Antigone in the British-Italian Sky Atlantic and Sky Italia historical drama Domina, set in Ancient Rome and centred around Livia Drusilla (Kasia Smutniak). That same year, Tchantcho was cast as Ondine, Vicomtesse de Valmont in the Starz adaptation of Dangerous Liaisons, which premiered in November 2022. She had performed Les Liaisons Dangereuses before during her time at LIPA. She is currently developing a one-woman stage show titled Dreamer. She has an upcoming role in the Paramount+ series The Blue.

Filmography

Stage

References

External links
 
 Colette Dalal Tchantcho at Independent Talent

Living people
21st-century Kuwaiti actresses
Alumni of the Liverpool Institute for Performing Arts
Kuwaiti expatriates in England
Actors with dyslexia
Theatre practitioners
Year of birth missing (living people)